The Rondu District, also spelled Roundu District, is one of the 14 districts of Pakistan-administered territory of Gilgit-Baltistan. The district encompasses the entire Roundu Valley, which is the fourth-largest valley in Gilgit-Baltistan, after the Skardu Valley, the Khaplu Valley, and the Shigar Valley  The valley is situated in the western part of the Baltistan Division and forms the main trade and travel route between the Baltistan Division and the Gilgit Division.  The Rondu District was created out of the Skardu District in 2019.

Demographics

The people of the Rondu Valley are predominantly Balti people, who speak the Balti language, but there are a significant number of Shina speaking people, as well.  People of the Roundu valley belong to Shia sect of Islam.  The district headquarters is the town of Dambudas, which is about 65–70 km from Skardu.  Although the population of Dambudas is less than that of the Stak, Thorchay, and Tormik valleys, Dambudas is located in the middle of the Rondu Valley, so it currently serves as the district headquarters. The literacy rate of the district is approximately 90%. About 70% of the residents speak Balti, and around 30% speak Shina, but most Shina people are bilingual, due to having living with Balti people for a long time.  The Rondu District has very scenic and lush green valleys, such as Bilamik, Talu Broq, Tormik, and Gunji, and has four union councils:  Mindi, Stak, Tormik, and Gunji.

References 

 
Baltistan
Valleys of Gilgit-Baltistan